Parkview is an unincorporated community in northern Harrison Township, Vigo County, in the U.S. state of Indiana.

Now within the boundaries of the city of Terre Haute, it is also part of the Terre Haute metropolitan area.

Geography

References

Unincorporated communities in Indiana
Unincorporated communities in Vigo County, Indiana
Terre Haute metropolitan area